Ewerton Teixeira (born February 13, 1982) is a Brazilian professional kickboxer, mixed martial artist, and Kyokushin Kaikan karateka. Teixeira obtained his first K-1 title in 2008 at K-1 World Grand Prix 2008 in Fukuoka by beating Keijiro Maeda in the final. He is training K-1 at the Ichigeki Academy Kyokushin Kaikan in Tokyo, Japan. Despite the short career for a kickboxer, Teixeira has notable wins against K-1 legends: Jerome Le Banner, Errol Zimmerman and Musashi.

Career
After becoming the ninth Kyokushin World Champion in 2007, Teixeira entered K-1 in 2008. His first K-1 fight was against Japanese fan-favourite Yusuke Fujimoto. He won the fight by right cross KO. Teixeira then won the 2008 Japan GP after knocking out Tsutomu Takahagi in the first round followed by two unanimous decision wins over Tsuyoshi Nakasako and Keijiro Maeda.

He was then placed in the 2008 WGP eliminations against Japanese veteran Musashi. He won by unanimous decision and qualified for his first World Grand Prix championships.

In the quarter finals, he fought his first non-Japanese opponent, Errol Zimmerman. Teixeira surprised the world by beating Zimmerman throughout the fight until he was dropped in the third round and ended up losing the fight by decision.

In Yokohama in March 2009, Teixeira beat Jerome Lebanner by decision in the 5th round. At the Final 16, despite being a big favourite and promising a KO against the new Asia champion, Sing Jaideep, he won a decision in the 5th round. In the finals he was knocked out by Alistair Overeem in round 1 after a knee to the chin.

In 2010, Teixeira fought K-1 World Grand Prix 2010 in Canberra as a super fight winning by KO over Alex Roberts.  He then fought in K-1 World Grand Prix 2010 in Seoul Final 16 against Mr K-1 Peter Aerts losing a close bout in the extra round extension.  The fight provided a defining moment to fans, finally proving that the Kyokushin fighter belonged in K-1.
Teixeira ended 2010 at the K-1 World Grand Prix 2010 Final as the Reserve match and once again surprised everyone by out classing Errol Zimmerman for a judges unanimous decision.

Texeira was waiting for engagement in K-1, but since there were no offers he decided to move to MMA, training with former UFC Heavyweight champion Junior dos Santos. He made his MMA debout on 23. Jun 2012, winning the fight via KO in round 3. Texeira said that he still wants to fight in K-1 if some bigger organisation offers the contract, but until then, he plans to fight under MMA rules.

He lost to Hesdy Gerges by unanimous decision at Glory 13: Tokyo - Welterweight World Championship Tournament in Tokyo, Japan on December 21, 2013.

Titles and accomplishments
Kickboxing
2008 K-1 World GP in Fukuoka champion (defeated Keijiro Maeda in Final)
Kyokushin
2011 2nd Place - 10th Kyokushin World Open Karate Tournament IKO 1 (Lost to Tariel Nikosheivili)
2011 5th Place - All American Open Karate Championships (Lost to Shouki Arata)
2007  9th Kyokushin World Open Karate Tournament IKO 1 (Defeated Jan Soukup)
2007  All American Open Karate Championships (Defeated Andrews Nakahara)
2006  All American Open Karate Championships (Lost to Andrews Nakahara)
2005  3rd Kyokushin World Weight Tournament Heavyweight (Defeated Lechi Kurbanov)
2004  All American Open Karate Championships (Defeated Eduardo Tanaka)
2003  8th Kyokushin World Open Karate Tournament IKO 1(Lost to Hitoshi Kiyama/Defeated Glaube Feitosa)
2003  All American Open Karate Championships (Defeated Sergey Osipov)
2002  All American Open Karate Championships (Defeated Lechi Kurbanov)
2002  2nd World Team Cup (Defeats Russia)
2001  All American Open Karate Championships (Defeated Kentaro Tanaka)
2001  Brazilian Open (Lost to Ulysses Isobe)
2001  2nd Kyokushin World Weight Tournament Heavyweight final 16
2000  Paulista Championships
2000 Brazilian Open Final 16

Kickboxing record

|-  style="background:#fbb;"
| 2013-12-21 || Loss ||align=left| Hesdy Gerges || Glory 13: Tokyo || Tokyo, Japan || Decision (Unanimous) || 3 || 3:00 || 11-4
|-  style="background:#cfc;"
| 2010-12-11 || Win ||align=left| Errol Zimmerman || K-1 World Grand Prix 2010 Final || Tokyo, Japan || Decision (Unanimous) || 3 || 3:00 ||11-3
|-  style="background:#fbb;"
| 2010-10-02 || Loss ||align=left| Peter Aerts || K-1 World Grand Prix 2010 in Seoul Final 16 || Seoul, Republic of Korea || Ext R. Decision (Unanimous) || 4 || 3:00 || 10-3
|-  style="background:#cfc;"
| 2010-07-10 || Win ||align=left| Alex Roberts || K-1 World Grand Prix 2010 in Canberra || Canberra, Australia || TKO (Referee stop/three knockdowns) || 1 || 2:00 || 10-2 
|-  style="background:#fbb;"
| 2009-12-05 || Loss ||align=left| Alistair Overeem || K-1 World Grand Prix 2009 Final || Yokohama, Japan || KO (knee) || 1 || 1:06 || 9-2
|-  style="background:#cfc;"
| 2009-09-26 || Win ||align=left| Singh Jaideep || K-1 World Grand Prix 2009 Final 16 || Seoul, Republic of Korea || 2 Ext R. Decision (Unanimous) || 5 || 3:00 || 9-1
|-  style="background:#cfc;"
| 2009-03-28 || Win ||align=left| Jerome Le Banner || K-1 World GP 2009 in Yokohama || Yokohama, Japan || 2 Ext R. Decision (Split) || 5 || 3:00 || 8-1
|-  style="background:#fbb;"
| 2008-12-06 || Loss ||align=left| Errol Zimmerman || K-1 World GP 2008 Final || Yokohama, Japan || Decision (Majority) || 3 || 3:00 || 7-1
|-  style="background:#cfc;"
| 2008-09-27 || Win ||align=left| Musashi || K-1 World Grand Prix 2008 in Seoul Final 16 || Seoul, Korea || Decision (Unanimous) || 3 || 3:00 || 7-0
|-  style="background:#cfc;"
| 2008-06-29 || Win ||align=left| Kyotaro || K-1 World GP 2008 in Fukuoka || Fukuoka, Japan || Decision (Unanimous) || 3 || 3:00 || 6-0
|-
! style=background:white colspan=9 |
|-  style="background:#cfc;"
| 2008-06-29 || Win ||align=left| Tsuyoshi Nakasako || K-1 World GP 2008 in Fukuoka || Fukuoka, Japan || Decision (Unanimous) || 3 || 3:00 || 5-0
|-  style="background:#cfc;"
| 2008-06-29 || Win ||align=left| Tsutomu Takahagi || K-1 World GP 2008 in Fukuoka || Fukuoka, Japan || KO (Knee strike) || 1 || 2:18 || 4-0
|-  style="background:#cfc;"
| 2008-04-13 || Win ||align=left| Yusuke Fujimoto || K-1 World GP 2008 in Yokohama || Yokohama, Japan || 2 Ext R. KO (Right cross) || 5 || 2:01 || 3-0
|-  style="background:#cfc;"
| 2004-05-30 || Win ||align=left| Petar Majstorovic || Kyokushin vs K-1 2004 All Out Battle || Tokyo, Japan || Decision || 3 || 3:00 || 2-0
|-  style="background:#cfc;"
| 2003-02-22 || Win ||align=left| Tatsuya Kato || Kyokushin vs K-1 2003 All Out Battle || Tokyo, Japan || Decision || 3 || 3:00 || 1-0
|-
| colspan=9 | Legend:

Mixed martial arts record

|-
|Loss
|align=center| 3–1
| Vinicius Queiroz
| Submission (arm-triangle choke)
| Bellator 143
| 
| align=center| 2
| align=center| 4:00
| Hidalgo, Texas, United States
|
|-
|Win
|align=center| 3–0 
| Eduardo Pezao
| Decision (Unanimous)
| Imperium - MMA Pro 3
| 
|align=center|3
|align=center|5:00
|Salvador, Brazil
|
|-
|Win
|align=center| 2–0 
| Edinaldo Novaes
| Decision (Unanimous)
| Imperium - MMA Pro 1
| 
|align=center|3
|align=center|5:00
|Salvador, Brazil
|
|-
|Win
|align=center| 1–0 
| Raul Bazanes
| KO (Knee)
| CPMMAF - Champion Fights
| 
|align=center|3
|align=center|0:50
|Salvador, Brazil
|MMA debut.
|

See also
 List of K-1 events
 List of male kickboxers

References

External links
 Teixeira Interview after his All-America Tournament Triumphant 

Brazilian male kickboxers
Heavyweight kickboxers
Brazilian male karateka
Brazilian expatriate sportspeople in Japan
Brazilian male mixed martial artists
Mixed martial artists utilizing Kyokushin kaikan
Sportspeople from São Paulo
Living people
1982 births